Club Deportivo Delfines de Abasolo is a football club that plays in the Liga TDP. It is based in the city of Abasolo, Mexico.

History
The team was founded in 1978 as Club Deportivo Delfines de Abasolo, however, previously there had been other professional teams in the town such as the Club Deportivo Hidalgo and the Club Deportivo Abasolo, these teams won various regional tournaments in central Mexico. 

In 1978, the Delfines began their participation in Third Division. In 1991, the team won the promotion to Segunda División 'B', after defeating Ola Naranja de Zacatecas in the promotion playoff. In 1992, the team defeated C.D. Tapatío and was promoted to Segunda División. however, due to the lack of conditions to play in a better category, the team's franchise was acquired by other entrepreneurs and became Marte Morelos. Abasolo's team continued to play in the Third Division.

Stadium
The team plays its home games at the Estadio Municipal de Abasolo, which has a capacity to accommodate 2,500 spectators.

Players

First-team squad

References 

Football clubs in Guanajuato
Association football clubs established in 1978
1978 establishments in Mexico